Irving Trust was an American Commercial bank headquartered in New York City that operated between 1851 and 1988 when it was acquired by Bank of New York.  From 1965 the bank was the principal subsidiary of the Irving Bank Corporation.

Between 1913 and 1931, its headquarters was in the Woolworth Building; after 1931, until it was acquired by Bank of New York, its headquarters was located at One Wall Street, at what is now known as the BNY Mellon Building.

History

The bank had its origins in 1851, when the Irving Bank of the City of New York was founded.  Since there was not yet a federal currency, each bank issued its own paper and those institutions with the most appealing names found their certificates more widely accepted. The firm was named after Washington Irving, an author, diplomat, and lawyer who had gained an international reputation as America's first man of letters. His portrait appeared on the bank's notes and contributed to their wide appeal.

In June 1865, it converted from a state bank to a bank chartered under the National Bank Act of 1863, and became the Irving National Bank of New York. In 1907, after a merger, it became the Irving National Exchange Bank of New York, changing its name to the Irving National Bank in 1912. In 1918, it acquired by merger the Market and Fulton National Bank of New York, and in 1919 the Sherman National Bank of New York and the National City Bank of Brooklyn. In 1922, it merged with the Columbia Trust Company, a New York State-chartered bank, creating the Irving Bank and Trust Company. Later, in 1926, it acquired by merger the American Exchange-Pacific Bank, and changed its name to the American Exchange Irving Trust Company. Finally, in 1929, it changed its name to the Irving Trust Company, the name under which it was known until 1989.

As of March 9, 1921, there were four national banks in New York City operating branch offices, also including Chatham and Phenix National, the Mechanics and Metals National, the Irving National, and National City Bank.

In 1922, Irving Trust opened an account with Vnesheconombank, now known as VEB, enabling the bank to conduct transactions with Russia and later the Soviet Union.

In 1923, Irving Trust held correspondent accounts for the sovzagranbank Russo-Iranian Bank (RIB) also known a Rusiranbank.

In 1929, Irving was New York's fourth ranked financial institution, and fifth in the United States.

Irving Trust was an official sponsor of the 1980 Winter Olympic Games in Lake Placid, New York.

In 1983, the Irving Trust had 13 branches in New York and was primarily a wholesale bank working with mid- and large-sized corporations and banks. It also had offices around the world, allowing for their claim that the sun never set on the Irving.

In 1986, Natasha Kagalovsky (née Gurfinkel) became an employee as head of the department handling accounts with the Soviet Union and Eastern Europe.

Merged into Bank of New York
On October 7, 1988, the Irving Trust board signed an agreement to merge with Bank of New York ending a yearlong battle as Bank of New York engineered a hostile takeover.  At the time of the merger the combined banks became the United States' 12th largest bank with asset of $42 billion.  During that year Irving had been trying to participate in a friendly merger with Banca Commerciale Italiana.

See also

Irving Trust Company Building

Notes

References

Banks based in New York City
BNY Mellon
Defunct financial services companies of the United States
American companies established in 1851
Banks established in 1851
Banks disestablished in 1988
Defunct banks of the United States
1851 establishments in New York (state)
1988 disestablishments in New York (state)
Defunct companies based in New York City
Defunct banks of New York City